Abrosima was a Persian Christian priest and martyr. His name is also listed as Abrosimus.

He was stoned to death with many of his parishioners in 341 or 342 during the reign of the Sassanid ruler Shapur II.

His feast day is celebrated on April 22 in the Roman Catholic Church, and on November 10 in the Greek Orthodox Church.

References

Sources
Holweck, F. G. A Biographical Dictionary of the Saints. St. Louis, MO: B. Herder Book Co. 1924.

4th-century Christian saints
Year of birth missing
Persian saints
4th-century Christian clergy
People executed by the Sasanian Empire
Christians in the Sasanian Empire
4th-century Christian martyrs
341 deaths